is a Japanese football player and assistant manager for Thai League 2 club Trat.

References

External links

1982 births
Living people
Juntendo University alumni
Association football people from Chiba Prefecture
Japanese footballers
J2 League players
Japan Football League players
Hiromichi Katano
Hong Kong First Division League players
Tochigi SC players
SP Kyoto FC players
Giravanz Kitakyushu players
Hiromichi Katano
Hong Kong Rangers FC players
Hiromichi Katano
Japanese expatriate footballers
Japanese expatriate sportspeople in Thailand
Expatriate footballers in Thailand
Expatriate footballers in Hong Kong
Association football defenders